Alcatraz is an island in San Francisco Bay, California, United States.

Alcatraz may also refer to:

Buildings and structures
 Alcatraz Federal Penitentiary, a former maximum-security Federal prison on Alcatraz Island
 Fort Alcatraz, a military post on Alcatraz Island
 Alcatraz Island Lighthouse
 Alcatraz East, crime museum in Pigeon Forge, Tennessee

Places
 Alcatraz, Cape Verde, a village on the island of Maio
 Little Alcatraz (formerly known as Paul Pry Rock), a small rock in San Francisco Bay roughly 81 yards (74 m) off the Model Industries Building, off the northwest coast of Alcatraz Island

People
 Al Katrazz (born 1971), ringname of wrestler Brian Fleming

Events
 Battle of Alcatraz (May 2 to 4, 1946),  the result of an unsuccessful escape attempt at Alcatraz Federal Penitentiary
 June 1962 Alcatraz escape attempt, at Alcatraz Federal Penitentiary
 Occupation of Alcatraz (November 20, 1969 to June 11, 1971),  an occupation of Alcatraz Island by 89 American Indians and supporters, whose group chose the name Indians of All Tribes (IOAT), seeking to reclaim the island under the US honor the Treaty of Fort Laramie (1868) between the U.S. and the Lakota, which stated all retired, abandoned or out-of-use federal land was returned to the Native people who once occupied it

Arts, entertainment, and media

Fictional characters
 Alcatraz, the main character in the 2011 videogame Crysis 2 by Crytek
 Alcatraz Smedry, the main character of five juvenile fiction novels by Brandon Sanderson

Games
Alcatraz (video game), a 1992 sequel to the Infogrames game, Hostages
Alcatraz coup, an illegal bridge (card game) manoeuvreAlcatraz: Prison Escape, a 2001 computer video game

Music
 Alcatraz (album), by the Mr. T Experience
 Alcatraz, a Welsh rock band formed by members of Quicksand (Welsh band)  
 Alcatrazz, an American heavy metal band 1983–1987
 Alkatrazz, a British heavy metal band 1981–1983

Films and television
 Alcatraz Island (film) a 1937 Warner Bros. film
Alcatraz (TV series), a 2012 Fox television series

Plants and animalsAlcatraz, a Spanish name for Zantedeschia (the calla lily)Bothrops alcatraz, a species of snake in the family ViperidaeScinax alcatraz'', a species of frog in the family Hylidae

See also

Alcaraz (disambiguation)